The Extra 200 (Type EA-200) is a two-seat, tandem arrangement, low-wing aerobatic monoplane with conventional (taildragger) landing gear fully capable of Unlimited category competition, built by Extra Flugzeugbau.

Designed by Walter Extra, it was introduced to the United States market in 1996.  The Extra 200 is slightly smaller than the Extra 300, and is powered by a 200 hp (149 kW) rather than the Extra 300's 300 hp (224 kW) Lycoming engine making it a great choice for those on a restricted budget. It offers the flying characteristics of the EA-300, is capable of all unlimited maneuvers, and makes a great all-round training/sports aerobatic aircraft.

Design
The Extra 200 is based on the design of the Extra 300, and the two aircraft share many similarities. The Extra 200 has a welded steel (4130) tube fuselage covered in fiberglass and fabric with a carbon/glass hybrid composite empennage (i.e., the tail assembly, including the horizontal and vertical stabilizers, elevators, and rudder), and a bubble canopy. The monocoque wings have a carbon fiber composite spar with fiberglass skins and an integral fuel tank. A symmetrical airfoil, mounted with a zero angle of incidence, provides equal performance in both upright and inverted flight. The landing gear is fixed taildragger style with composite main legs and fiberglass wheel pants. The piston-engined powerplant is a fuel-injected Lycoming AEIO-360-A1E that produces 200 horsepower (149 kW), and it is equipped with a 3-bladed constant-speed MTV-12-B-C/C 183-17e propeller made of laminated wood encased in glass-fiber reinforced plastic. The Extra 200 is stressed for ±10 G with one person on board and ±8 G with two, and has an FAA certified load factor in the US to ±10 G.

Background
In the late 1990s, the Extra 200 was considerably less expensive, at $170,000 (1996 new), versus the Extra 300L's price of $235,000 (1996 new). The Extra 200 is now back in limited production (2007) after a hiatus in which Extra Aircraft focused on the development of the Extra EA-500 whose costs of development forced the company into bankruptcy. With new ownership, the company is again producing a range of aerobatic aircraft including the EA-200.  The base price is $225,000 as of 2007.

Specifications (Extra 200 EA-200)

Data from flugzeuginfo.net

General characteristics
 Crew: one pilot or two in tandem
 Capacity: two pilots
 Length: 6.80 m (22 ft 4 in)
 Wingspan: 7.50 m (24 ft 7 in)
 Airfoil: symmetrical
 Height: 2.56 m (8 ft 5 in)
 Wing area: 10.4 m2 (112 ft2)
 Empty: 540 kg (1,190 lb)
 Loaded: 800 kg (1770 lb) (two pilot aerobatic configuration)
 Maximum takeoff: 870 kg (1,914 lb)
 Powerplant: Lycoming AEIO-360-A1E, 149 kW (200 hp)
 FAA/EASA Certified Load Factor: ±10 G with one person on board

Performance
 Never Exceed Speed: 396 km/h, 217 kn (248 mph)
 Maneuvering Speed: 154 kn
 Stall Speed: 53-59 kn
 Range: 
 Service ceiling: 4,573  m (15,000 ft)
 Rate of climb: 686 m/min (2,250 ft/min)
 Wing loading: 83,65 kg/m2 ( 17,09 lb/ft2)
 Power/Mass: 0,1713 kW/kg ( 0,1045 hp/lb)

See also
Related development:
Extra 300

Comparable aircraft:
CAP-10
Pitts S-2
Giles G-202

References

External links

 Manufacturer's Website—Specifications, addresses of the company dealers, pictures and movies.
 Service Manual — Provides information necessary for servicing, maintaining, and repair of the EA-200.
  Pilots Information Handbook:  This document is a "generic" version of the EA-200 Pilot's Operating Handbook (POH) and it allows a pilot to study specific aircraft attributes and procedures without removing the regulatory document from the aircraft.

EA-200
1990s German sport aircraft
Aerobatic aircraft
Low-wing aircraft
Single-engined tractor aircraft
Aircraft first flown in 1996
Conventional landing gear